is  the Head coach of the Japan national 3x3 teams. On October 6, 2019, he celebrated the greater success of his career by winning the  3x3 U23 World Championship,  the Japan's first-ever world title in basketball.

Head coaching record

|- 
| style="text-align:left;"|Toyota Alvark
| style="text-align:left;"|2006
| 24||16||8|||| style="text-align:center;"|2nd|||5||5||0||
| style="text-align:center;"|JBL Champions
|-
| style="text-align:left;"|Toyota Alvark
| style="text-align:left;"|2007-08
| 35||21||14|||| style="text-align:center;"|2nd|||7||4||3||
| style="text-align:center;"|Runners-up
|-
| style="text-align:left;"|Levanga Hokkaido
| style="text-align:left;"|2011-12
| 42||22||20|||| style="text-align:center;"|5th|||-||-||-||
| style="text-align:center;"|-
|-

References

1972 births
Living people
Alvark Tokyo coaches
German basketball coaches
German expatriate sportspeople in Japan
Levanga Hokkaido coaches
Sportspeople from Chemnitz